Shashidhar is an Indian name that may refer to
Shashidhar Adapa (born 1955), Indian production designer, set designer and puppet designer
Shashidhar Chiron, Indian entrepreneur
Shashidhar Mishra (1975–2010), Indian Right to Information Act activist 
Marri Shashidhar Reddy (born 1949), Indian politician
Ranganathan Shashidhar (born 1946), US-based Indian physicist